The 1974 Tipperary Senior Hurling Championship was the 84th staging of the Tipperary Senior Hurling Championship since its establishment by the Tipperary County Board in 1887. The championship ran from 19 May to 13 October 1974.

Roscrea entered the championship as the defending champions.

The final was played on 13 October 1974 at Semple Stadium in Thurles, between Thurles Sarsfields and Silvermines, in what was their first ever meeting in the final. Thurles Sarsfields won the match by 3-06 to 1-10 to claim their 28th championship title overall and a first title in nine years.

Results

Quarter-finals

Semi-finals

Final

Statistics

Miscellaneous
 Thurles Sarsfields win their first title since 1965.
 Silvermines qualify for the final for the first,and to date only, time.

References

Tipperary
Tipperary Senior Hurling Championship